Joseph ben Moses Babad (1801 in Przeworsk – 1874 in Ternopil) was a rabbi, posek and Talmudist, best known for his work, the Minchat Chinuch, a commentary on the Sefer Hachinuch.

Babad served as rabbi at Bohorodczany, Zbarizh, Sniatyn, and Tarnopol where in 1857 he was appointed as Av Beit Din, a position he held for the rest of his life.

He studied under Chaim Halberstam, the Sanzer Rov, and enjoyed close relationships with the various Hasidic leaders of Galicia.

Rabbi Babad's first wife is not known; he later married the sister of Chaim Halberstam, and after her death he again remarried.

Minchat Chinuch
Minchat Chinuch is a legal commentary on the Sefer ha-Chinuch. The Sefer Ha-Chinuch systematically discusses the 613 commandments of the Torah, their Biblical source, and philosophical underpinnings - while the Minchat Chinuch serves as a legal commentary through the perspective of the Talmud and Rishonim. Minchat Chinuch is widely studied in Yeshivas and in private study groups, and remains popular to this day.

The work is noted for its technique of isolating legal concepts through the use of uncommon test cases, such as whether a hermaphrodite is obligated in the mitzvah of "be fruitful and multiply."  This feature of the book makes it a useful starting point in conceptual analysis of talmudic topics.

References

External links 
 Minchat Chinuch, chaburas.org
 Toldot ha-Minḥat ḥinukh: Yosef Babad, Eliy Amsel, Makhon Orah, 1995
 Minchat Chinuch, Part I, hebrewbooks.org
 Minchat Chinuch, Part II, hebrewbooks.org

1801 births
1874 deaths
People from Przeworsk
People from the Kingdom of Galicia and Lodomeria
Polish Hasidic rabbis
19th-century rabbis from the Russian Empire
Orthodox rabbis from Galicia (Eastern Europe)